Marchitelli is an Italian surname. Notable people with the surname include:

Chiara Marchitelli (born 1985), Italian women's footballer
Lele Marchitelli (born 1955), Italian musician and composer
Pietro Marchitelli (1643–1729), Italian violinist
Rosa Marchitelli, Canadian journalist

Italian-language surnames